The Kadin most ("bridge of the qadi") or Nevestin most (Невестин мост, "Nevestino bridge") is a 15th-century stone arch bridge over the Struma River at Nevestino, Kyustendil Province, in southwestern Bulgaria. It was constructed in 1470 on the order of Ishak Pasha during the reign of Ottoman sultan Mehmed II, as evidenced by the Ottoman Turkish stone inscription on one of the sides. The bridge has three arches, its longest span is 20 m.

Ottoman bridges in Bulgaria
Bridges completed in 1470
Buildings and structures in Kyustendil Province
Ottoman inscriptions
15th-century inscriptions
Stone arch bridges